Bayramaul (Bayram-Evl; , Bayramavul) is a rural locality (a selo) and the administrative centre of Bayramaulsky Selsoviet, Khasavyurtovsky District, Republic of Dagestan, Russia. The population was 2,858 as of 2010. There are 37 streets.

Geography 
Bayramaul is located 19 km northeast of Khasavyurt (the district's administrative centre) by road. Mutsalaul is the nearest rural locality.

References 

Rural localities in Khasavyurtovsky District